The Liechtenstein national football team represents Liechtenstein in association football and is controlled by the Liechtenstein Football Association (LFV), the governing body of the sport there. It competes as a member of the Union of European Football Associations (UEFA), which encompasses the countries of Europe. Liechtenstein joined UEFA and the International Federation of Association Football (FIFA) in 1974 but did not play an official match until 1981.

Liechtenstein's first match—a 1–1 draw against Malta—took place on 14 June 1981. They played only nine official matches between 1981 and 1993, with four taking place in 1981 and the other five were each played in a different year. Their first victory came in their third match, 3–2 against Indonesia. They entered their first major international competition in 1994: the qualifying rounds for 1996 UEFA European Football Championship. Liechtenstein made its first appearance in the qualifying rounds of the FIFA World Cup during the 1998 edition.

The team has won only 15 of its 190 matches, their largest victory came on 13 October 2004 when they defeated Luxembourg by four goals to nil in the 2006 FIFA World Cup qualification tournament. Their worst loss is an 11–1 against Macedonia in 1996. Peter Jehle holds the appearance record for Liechtenstein, having been capped 132 times since 1998. The goalscoring record is held by Mario Frick, who scored 16 times in 125 matches. As of April 2019, Liechtenstein are ranked 182nd in the FIFA World Rankings. Its highest ever ranking of 118th was achieved three times: January 2008, July 2011 and September 2011.

List of matches

1981–1993

1994

1995

1996

1997

1998

1999

2000

2001

2002

2003

2004

2005

2006

2007

2008

2009

2010

2011

2012

2013

2014

2015

2016

2017

2018

2019

Notes

References

External links
 
 

Results
Results